Manuel José Ossandón Irarrázabal, colloquially "Cote Ossandón", (born Viña del Mar, Región de Valparaíso, 24 August 1962) is an agricultural technician and a senator of Chile for the 8th Senatorial District. He was elected during the parliamentarian elections of 2013, for the period 2014–2022. Member of Chilean center-right party Renovación Nacional (RN). He renounced in July 2016.

Ossandón is actually one of the four most popular candidates for the presidential election of Chile in 2017 and was the second most voted senator of Chile during the parliamentarian elections of 2013. In 2015 he was recognized as the most prolific senator of the country.

Early life
Ossandón was born in Chile in Viña del Mar and raised in Pirque. After his studies, he worked as an agricultural engineer. In the countryside, he witnessed high rates of rural poverty and inequalities there and throughout Chile.

Political career

Beginnings
He started in politics as mayor of Pirque's municipality from year 1992 to 2000 and mayor of Puente Alto from 2000 to 2012.

A self-described social Christian, Ossandón has been focused during all his years as a politician fighting for poverty reduction and for increasing the quality of life of Chileans. He is very well known as well for fighting against Chilean political corruption, social injustices and enterprise collusions.

By the time he turned 30, he decided to run for mayor in the rural town of Pirque, a suburb of Santiago. He won with 21.86% of the votes and was re-elected for the next term, garnering 64.52% of the vote. In 2000, he decided to run for mayor in the largest municipality of Chile, Puente Alto.  He won with 45% of the vote, was re-elected in 2004 with 60% , then re-elected again in 2008 with 70%.

As Senator
His years as mayor helped Ossandón gain increasing popularity  and helped him to get elected as a senator of Chile. He ran for president in 2017, obtaining 27,6% in the presidential primaries (Sebastian Piñera won the candidacy with 57,5% of the vote).

Ossandón has built a reputation as a leading progressive voice on issues such as campaign finance reform, fighting political and business corruption.
Actually, he's candidate to the primaries elections for the "Chile Vamos" coalition and the most popular candidate of the center right according to the CEP poll of 2016.

In May 2020 he contracted COVID-19 and recovered the following month. An opponent of same-sex marriage, he criticized President Sebastián Piñera for pushing the bill legalizing it in the Chilean Congress, calling it a "low blow, it was a tremendous stab for many people who have a more conservative position, just before entering into an election, which was not necessary."

References 

Chilean politicians
Chilean people of French descent
1962 births
Living people
Inacap alumni
National Renewal (Chile) politicians
Senators of the LV Legislative Period of the National Congress of Chile
Senators of the LVI Legislative Period of the National Congress of Chile